1961 may refer to:

 The year 1961
 1961 (album), an album by Canadian electronic musician Aaron Funk
 "1961" (Heroes), an episode of the NBC TV series Heroes
 "1961", a 2012 song by the Fray from Scars & Stories